The following highways are numbered 658:

United States

Other places